Stephen James Pullin is an Anglican priest.

Pullin was educated at South Bank University. After two curacies in Bristol he was Bishop's Advisor for Deliverance Ministry from 2010 to 2014. He was in charge at Reading Minster and area dean until his appointment as Archdeacon of Berkshire in 2020.

References

1966 births
Alumni of London South Bank University
Archdeacons of Berkshire
Living people
21st-century Anglican priests